The Thilges Ministry formed the government of Luxembourg from 20 February 1885 to 22 September 1888.

Composition
Édouard Thilges: President of the Government, Minister of State, Director-General for Foreign Affairs
Paul Eyschen: Director-General for Justice
Henri Kirpach: Director-General for the Interior
Mathias Mongenast: Director-General for Finance

Transition 
Speculations on the stock market, which appeared like insider trading, brought about the fall of the Blochausen government. After the press revealed the suspicious transactions, the King-Grand Duke asked his Prime Minister to resign. He charged Emmanuel Servais with forming a new government. The latter suggested instead Édouard Thilges who, after some hesitation, took over a government that was devoted to continuity.

Policy 
With the exception of the bankruptcy of the Banque Fehlen & Cie in 1886, which had not recovered from the losses from the fall of the Banque nationale, the period of 1885-1889 went over without conflicts. The public finances under Mathias Mongenast were improved. The development of the Zollverein and the boom of the steel industry assured ever-growing revenues for the State. Important resources were invested in the expansion of the network of local railways. As an authentic liberal, Édouard Thilges advocated the non-intervention of the State in the functioning of the economy, even when some sectors ran into difficulties: "The government must lend support to all measures which may encourage the development of industry and trade in a general manner; but it must not intervene in favour of particular businesses […]. If we did something for one establishment ruined through their own fault, what would be our position towards other establishments, towards individuals who due to unexpected events find themselves in a difficult situation?"

Footnotes

References

Ministries of Luxembourg
History of Luxembourg (1815–1890)